Polystira albida, common name white giant turris, is a species of sea snail, a marine gastropod mollusk in the family Turridae, the turrids.

Distribution
P. albida can be found in Western Atlantic waters, ranging from the eastern coast of Florida south to Brazil.

Description

These large shells are slender, fusiform, with a narrow and long aperture and a white external surface.

Habitat
These tropical benthic gastropods live at depths of 15 to 229 m.

Life cycle
Embryos develop into free-swimming planktonic marine larvae (trocophore) and later into juvenile veligers.

Bibliography
 John Tucker – Catalog of Recent & Fossil Turrids
 Lamarck, J. B. 1816. Tableau Encyclopédique et Méthodique des Trois Règnes de la Nature  – Veuve Agasse: Paris.
 Norman A. Meinkoth – Audubon – Field Guide to North American Shells
 Perry, G. 1811. – Conchology – William Miller: London.
 Petuch, E. J. 1987. New Caribbean molluscan faunas – Coastal Education & Research Foundation: Charlottesville, Virginia. 
 Reeve, L. 1843. Monograph of the genus Pleurotoma Conchologia Iconica 
 Todd J.A. & Rawlings T.A. (2014). A review of the Polystira clade — the Neotropic's largest marine gastropod radiation (Neogastropoda: Conoidea: Turridae sensu stricto). Zootaxa. 3884(5): 445–491.,
 Turgeon, D. D., J. F. Quinn Jr., A. E. Bogan, E. V. Coan, F. G. Hochberg, W. G. Lyons, et al. (1998) – Common and scientific names of aquatic invertebrates from the United States and Canada: Mollusks, 2nd ed.  – American Fisheries Society Special Publication

References

External links
 ITIS
 Encyclopedia of life
 Animal Base
 
  Todd J.A. & Rawlings T.A. (2014). A review of the Polystira clade — the Neotropic's largest marine gastropod radiation (Neogastropoda: Conoidea: Turridae sensu stricto). Zootaxa. 3884(5): 445-491.

albida
Gastropods described in 1811